Naa Abeifaa Karbo II, was a Ghanaian politician, Paramount Chief of the Lawra Traditional Area and founding member of the Northern People's Party.

References

Ghanaian royalty
University of Ghana alumni
Northern People's Party politicians
Ghanaian MPs 1954–1956
Ghanaian MPs 1956–1965
Agriculture ministers of Ghana
Health ministers of Ghana
1927 births
2004 deaths